Nicholas Ridgely may refer to:

Nicholas Ridgely (born 1694) (1694–1755), justice of the Delaware colonial supreme court
Nicholas Ridgely (born 1762) (1762–1830), second Chancellor of Delaware